Lumenia is a genus of moths of the family Crambidae. It contains only one species, Lumenia colocasiae, which is found in Vietnam.

References

Pyraustinae
Crambidae genera
Taxa named by Joseph de Joannis